= The Lower Red Lion =

Pub in St. Albans, Hertfordshire, England

Coordinates: 51.7517°N 0.3465°W

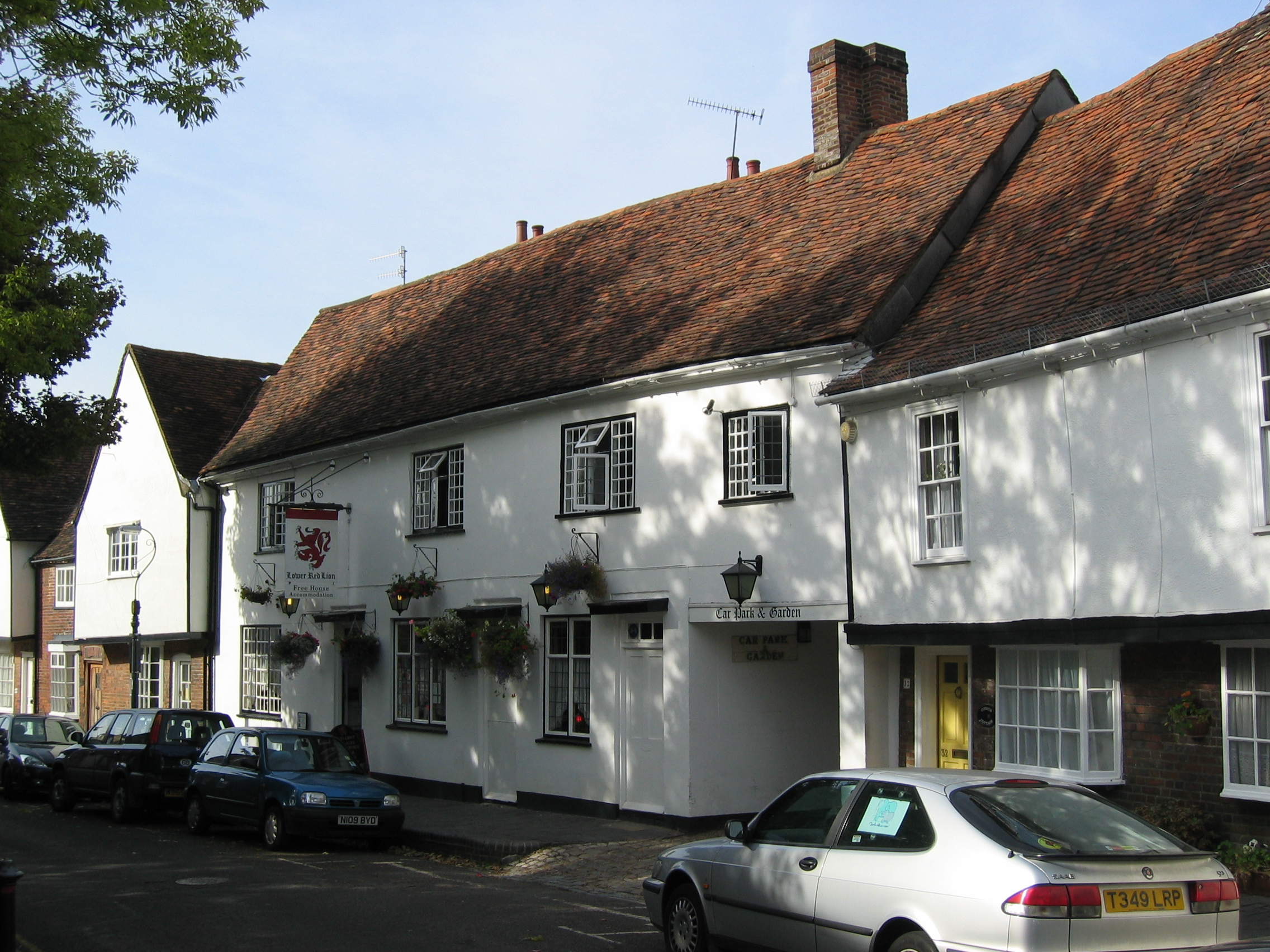
The Lower Red Lion

The Lower Red Lion is a public house at 34 and 36 Fishpool Street in St Albans, Hertfordshire, England. The building is seventeenth century and is designated Grade II with Historic England.
